15 ans et demi (also known as Daddy Cool) is a 2008 French comedy film by François Desagnat and Thomas Sorriaux, starring Daniel  Auteuil.

Cast
 Daniel Auteuil : Philippe Le Tallec
  : Églantine
 François Damiens : Jean-Maxence
 Lionel Abelanski : Guy
 Julie Ferrier : Fiona
 François Berléand : Albert Einstein
 Elise Larnicol : Sylvie
 Benjamin Siksou : Gaspard
 Lucie Lucas : Karine
 Philippe Duquesne : Jean-Louis
  : Denis
 Alain Chabat : Norbert
 Sara Mortensen : Barbara
 Coura Traoré : Anne-Sophie
 Canis Crevillen : Charlotte
 Lionel Lingelser : Vincent
 Maud Verdeyen : Zoé
 Dylan Imayanga : Enzo
 César Domboy : Achille
 Edwin Apps : A scientist
 Elie Semoun : The vindictive motorist
 Vincent Desagnat : Radio voice

Critical reception
French reviewers considered the film a creditable French attempt at an American-style teen movie, derivative but entertaining on its own terms.

Reviews
 Isabelle Regnier, "15 ans et demi" : un teen movie à la française, Le Monde, 29 April 2008.
 15 Ans et Demi, Premiere, 30 April 2008.

References

External links

French comedy films
2008 films
2008 comedy films
2000s French-language films
Films directed by François Desagnat
2000s French films